Anchor Drops is Umphrey's McGee's third studio album, released on June 29, 2004. It is the first studio album to feature drummer Kris Myers. For this album, the band mixed progressive rock with acoustic folk, jam band grooves, heavy metal and electronica. The album also contains a horn section (including Karl Denson) on the track "Wife Soup."

The cover is an overhead image of the city of Chicago. In the inner sleeve many close up shots of the city of Chicago are portrayed. On the cover, the word "Chicago" is written in maritime flags.

Track listing
 "Plunger" (Jake Cinninger, Brendan Bayliss) – 5:59
 "Anchor Drops" (Bayliss) – 4:48
 "In the Kitchen" (Cinninger, Bayliss) – 3:58
 "Bullhead City" (Cinninger, Bayliss) – 4:32
 Elliott Peck on vocals
 "Miss Tinkle's Overture" (Cinninger) – 5:37
 "Uncommon" (Mike Nolan, Bayliss) – 2:50
 "JaJunk pt.I" (Bayliss, Cinninger) – 3:19
 "13 Days" (Cinninger, Joel Cummins, Bayliss) – 4:28
 "JaJunk pt.II" (Bayliss, Cinninger) – 3:44
 "Walletsworth" (Cinninger, Bayliss) – 4:37
 "Robot World" (Ryan Stasik, Cinninger, Bayliss) – 5:00
 "Mulche's Odyssey" (Cinninger) – 4:56
 "Wife Soup" (Bayliss, Cinninger, Stasik, Cummins, Kris Myers) – 7:43
 Karl Denson on saxophone
 Andy Geib on trombone
 "The Pequod" (Cinninger) – 2:55

Personnel
 Brendan Bayliss - guitar, vocals
 Jake Cinninger - guitar, Moog, synthesizers, vocals
 Joel Cummins - keyboards, vocals
 Ryan Stasik - bass guitar
 Kris Myers - drums, vocals
 Andy Farag - percussion

Graphic Design: Rob Heimbrock

References

Umphrey's McGee albums
2004 albums